Sergio Villamayor (born 4 December 1989) is an Argentine modern pentathlete. He won the bronze medal in the men's individual event at the 2019 Pan American Games held in Lima, Peru. He also won the bronze medal in the men's relay event, alongside Emmanuel Zapata. He qualified to represent Argentina at the 2020 Summer Olympics in Tokyo, Japan.

In 2011, he competed in the men's individual event at the Pan American Games held in Guadalajara, Mexico without winning a medal. Four years later, in 2015, he competed in the men's individual event at the 2015 Pan American Games held in Toronto, Canada, also without winning a medal.

References

External links 
 

Living people
1989 births
Argentine male modern pentathletes
Pan American Games medalists in modern pentathlon
Pan American Games bronze medalists for Argentina
Modern pentathletes at the 2011 Pan American Games
Modern pentathletes at the 2015 Pan American Games
Modern pentathletes at the 2019 Pan American Games
Medalists at the 2019 Pan American Games
Modern pentathletes at the 2020 Summer Olympics
Olympic modern pentathletes of Argentina
People from Formosa, Argentina
20th-century Argentine people
21st-century Argentine people